Killer Tomatoes Eat France! is a 1992 American film that was released as the fourth and most recent sequel to Attack of the Killer Tomatoes. Like its predecessor, Killer Tomatoes Strike Back, it was a direct-to-video release. The film had been intended as the third in the series according to Return of the Killer Tomatoes but was replaced as the third film by Killer Tomatoes Strike Back. It is the final film made by New World Pictures before their sale to News Corporation in 1997. Because the film was co-produced with the corporate successor 20th Century Fox, (1997 merger), this is the only New World film whose rights are solely owned by 20th Century Fox.

Plot
Dr. Mortimer Gangreen (John Astin) escapes from prison and has set up a base at his assistant Igor's 'Really Big Castle' located outside Paris, France, and he is still bent on global domination. Using his Killer Tomatoes, Gangreen plans to stage a second French revolution according to an old prophecy written by Nicodemus, in which the king of France (Louis XVII) will return to claim the throne. The only image of Louis XVII shows that he bears a close resemblance to Igor (Steve Lundquist), and Gangreen plans to use this to his advantage to have Igor impersonate Louis XVII to claim the throne.

The heroes of the film are a has-been TV actor named Michael (Marc Price) and Marie, the French girl he meets and falls in love with (Angela Visser).

As the Killer Tomatoes begin their attack on France and they have a giant, fire-breathing tomato that gobbles a tour guide and sliced right after surprisingly not showing the tour guide again. Hoping to reach the outskirts of Paris, the true King returns and faces a showdown with Igor as to who shall rightly become king. With the help of Michael and Marie, Louis triumphs, and Gangreen escapes in a tomato-shaped hot-air balloon, planning revenge and swearing to return in the next movie.

Cast
Marc Price as Michael
Angela Visser as Marie
Steve Lundquist as Igor and Louis XVII (dual role)
John Astin as Professor Mortimer Gangreen
Rick Rockwell as Ze Captain
Kevin West as the Concert Emcee
Eileen Bowman as the Tour Guide

Production
The film hams up French stereotypes (including references to eating snails), however, it appears to condone the actions of French Monarchist groups like Nouvelle Action Royaliste. Several people are shown attempting to prove themselves as the true Queen of France, and the female lead is heard saying: "The French Revolution was a big mistake."

The characters of Zoltan, Kethuck and Viper are borrowed from Attack of the Killer Tomatoes: The Animated Series but are given completely different appearances.  Zoltan was redesigned with an eyepatch and various stitching over his body, Ketchuck was refined as a Larry Fine character and was no longer drooling and obese like his cartoon counterpart, and Viper was based on a similar character, Fang, another snake-based tomato.

Differences from previous Killer Tomatoes films
Several points in this movie were different from those made in the first three Killer Tomatoes films. Most notable is the fact that the tomatoes speak fluent English, whereas in all other movies it was proven they had their own language. Additionally, vegetables and fruits were shown to be sentient without Gangreen's help, whereas it was only via Gangreen's experiments that they were shown to become sentient.

References

External links

 

1992 films
New World Pictures films
20th Century Fox films
1990s parody films
Attack of the Killer Tomatoes
1992 direct-to-video films
Films about food and drink
Films set in castles
Films set in France
Films set in Paris
1992 comedy films
Cultural depictions of Louis XVII
Parodies of horror
1990s English-language films